The Maryland Sister States Program was established in 1980 to provide a forum for the promotion of international cooperation and understanding. Through broad-based citizen participation in a wide variety of exchanges in areas of mutual interest, the Sister States Program offers countless opportunities to develop partnership around the world in art, culture, transportation, film, women's issues, business, education, health care, professional development, sports, law, and more.

Active Sister State relationships
The Maryland Sister States Program currently includes currently includes 20 relationships in 17 countries.

1980  Anhui Province, China
1981  Kanagawa Prefecture, Japan
1981 Nord-Pas de Calais, France 
1981 Walloon Region, Belgium 
1991  Gyeongsangnam-do, Korea
1993  Leningrad Oblast/City of St. Petersburg, Russia
1993  State of Jalisco, Mexico
1993  Łódź Region, Poland
1999  State of Rio de Janeiro, Brazil
2007  Bong & Maryland Counties, Liberia
2009  Harju County, Estonia
2011 Ninh Thuan Province, Vietnam 
2012 Kocaeli Municipality, Turkey 
2013 County Cork, Ireland 
2013 Ondo and Cross River States, Nigeria
2015 KwaZulu-Natal, South Africa  
2016 Negev Administrative District, Israel
2017 Jeollanam-Do, Korea

Sister Cities International membership
Through partnership between U.S. and international communities, Sister Cities International and its members act as citizen diplomats building global cooperation at the municipal level, promoting cultural understanding and stimulating economic development.

External links
Maryland Secretary of State homepage

Organizations based in Maryland